Florian Tristan Mariano Thauvin (born 26 January 1993) is a French professional footballer who plays as a winger for Italian  club Udinese.

He made his professional debut for Grenoble in 2011, moving on to Bastia where he won the Ligue 2 title in his first season and being named Young Player of the Year a year later. He then moved to Marseille for €15 million, going on to make over 281 appearances and score 86 goals across two spells at the team, with a brief time at Newcastle United of the Premier League in between.

Thauvin earned 30 caps and scored 14 goals for France from under-18 to under-21 level, winning the 2013 FIFA U-20 World Cup. He made his senior debut in June 2017 and was part of their squad that won the 2018 FIFA World Cup.

Club career

Early career
Born in Orléans, Thauvin played for youth teams at Ingre, Saint-Jean-de-la-Ruelle, Orléans, and Grenoble before rising through the ranks at the latter, and drawing the interest of larger clubs. He made his first team debut for Grenoble on 11 March 2011 in a 1–1 Ligue 2 away draw against Vannes.
Grenoble was relegated to the CFA 2 after its liquidation in July 2011.

Bastia
On 19 July 2011, Thauvin departed the club and signed his first professional contract with Corsican side Bastia. On 28 October 2012, he scored his first goal for Bastia in a 3–1 victory over Bordeaux. He helped Bastia to Ligue 2 title triumph in 2012.

On 29 January 2013, Thauvin signed a four-and-a-half-year deal with Ligue 1 club Lille for a reported fee of €3.5 million. As part of the deal, he was immediately sent back to Bastia on a six-month loan deal, keeping him at the top-flight Corsican club until the end of the 2012–13 season. Following his impressive displays that season, Thauvin was named the Ligue 1 Young Player of the Year.

Marseille
On 3 September 2013, after weeks of drawn-out negotiations and without making single appearance for Lille, Thauvin signed a five-year deal with Olympique de Marseille. The 20-year-old had been absent from training due to disputes over an improved contract, and forced a move to the Stade Velodrome, eventually signing for €15 million including bonuses.

On 4 January 2015, Thauvin was the only Marseille player to miss in the penalty shootout as they were eliminated from the Coupe de France last 64 by fourth-tier former club Grenoble. Thauvin made 81 appearances over two seasons, scoring 15 goals.

Newcastle United

On 19 August 2015, Thauvin joined Newcastle United signing a five-year deal, for a reported fee of £15 million, with Rémy Cabella going in the other direction to Marseille on a season-long deal, with an option to buy. Thauvin was handed the departing Cabella's number 20 shirt. He made his debut three days later, replacing compatriot Gabriel Obertan, in the 69th minute of a goalless draw against Manchester United at Old Trafford, a game in which he had a chance to score a winner, but he was unable to reach a cross. He made his first start for the club against Northampton Town in the League Cup second round on 25 August, scoring a goal and making three assists in a 4–1 home victory.

Thauvin was criticised by Newcastle's all-time top scorer Alan Shearer for turning up to a game wearing a tuxedo. In February 2016, he told L'Équipe that the criticism was unfair and affected his performances.

Return to Marseille
On 31 January 2016, Newcastle announced Thauvin would return to Marseille on loan for the rest of the season. In the first game of his loan, on 2 February, he was sent off ten minutes after coming on as a substitute at Montpellier for a foul on Hilton. He scored the only goal on 20 April as they beat FC Sochaux-Montbéliard 1–0 away in the semi-finals to reach the final of the 2016 Coupe de France against Le Classique rivals Paris Saint-Germain, which they lost 4–2 with Thauvin scoring a goal.

On 4 August 2016, Thauvin began his second loan spell at Marseille, signing a season-long loan deal; Newcastle inserted a clause in the contract which gave Marseille the option to make the deal permanent. In November 2016, it was reported that the loan spell would be made permanent in the summer of 2017, with Marseille agreeing to pay £9.8 million (€11m) for Thauvin's permanent transfer once he had played just three matches for the club during his second loan spell.

Thauvin captained Marseille for the first time in the 2016–17 Coupe de France round of 64 away match against Toulouse on 8 January 2017, which Marseille won 2–1. On 10 March, he scored two goals in the 3–0 Ligue 1 home win over Angers, taking his tally to four goals in his last four Ligue 1 matches. He was the UNFP Player of the Month for March, with three goals and two assists. On 30 April, Thauvin scored the first hat-trick of his senior club career and assisted one of Maxime Lopez's two goals in a 5–1 Ligue 1 away win over Caen.

On 2 February 2018, Thauvin scored another hat-trick in a 6–3 home win over Metz. He won two more Player of the Month awards for November and February, and finished the 2017–18 Ligue 1 season with 22 goals, behind only PSG's Edinson Cavani for top scorer. He was one of four candidates for the Player of the Season award, that ultimately went to the Parisians' Neymar. In the season's Europa League, he contributed four goals in fourteen games for the team, who lost the final to Atlético Madrid in Lyon.

In 2018–19, Thauvin was Ligue 1's fourth-highest scorer with 16 goals in 33 games, though Marseille finished fifth and missed out on European football; his tally included a hat-trick in a 3–1 win at Amiens on 25 November. He was sent off two months later in a 2–1 home loss to Lille. In September 2019, he was ruled out with ankle ligament injury, returning in March only for the season to be abandoned due to the coronavirus pandemic. On 13 September 2020, Thauvin scored the only goal of an away win against Paris Saint-Germain, to grant Marseille their first win in Le Classique since November 2011.

Tigres UANL 
On 7 May 2021, Thauvin signed with Mexican team, Tigres UANL, joining the club after finishing out his contract with Marseille in June 2021 and reuniting with former Marseille teammate André-Pierre Gignac. After participating in the 2020 Tokyo Summer Olympics he made his Tigres debut on 7 August 2021 against Santos Laguna. Thauvin was sent off in the 35th minute.

On 23 January 2023, Tigres announced that they had terminated Thauvin's contract.

Udinese
On 31 January 2023, Thauvin joined Serie A club Udinese on a two-and-a-half year deal.

International career

Youth
Thauvin was a regular in the France national youth football team and represented them at the under-18, under-19, under-20 and under-21 levels. Thauvin was a member of the French squad which won the 2013 FIFA U-20 World Cup in Turkey. He scored a penalty in the 4–0 win over Uzbekistan in the quarter-finals and a brace in a 2–1 victory against Ghana in the semi-finals.

Senior
Thauvin was called up to the senior France squad for the first time to face Luxembourg in a 2018 World Cup qualifying match on 25 March 2017 and Spain in a friendly three days later; he did not play in either match. On 2 June 2017, Thauvin made his debut for Les Bleus in a 5–0 friendly win over Paraguay, coming on in the 80th minute as a substitute for Antoine Griezmann.

Thauvin was selected in the 23-man squad for the 2018 FIFA World Cup in Russia. He played one minute as Didier Deschamps' team won the tournament, in a 4–3 win over Argentina in the last 16 in Kazan in place of Kylian Mbappé.

On 11 June 2019, Thauvin scored a bicycle kick (his first senior international goal) in the 4–0 away win over Andorra in a UEFA Euro 2020 qualifying match, after having assisted Wissam Ben Yedder's goal 16 minutes earlier.

Thauvin was named as one of three overage players for the French Olympic team for the 2020 tournament in Japan. One of the others was his new Tigres teammate, André-Pierre Gignac.

Style of play
In January 2014, he was named by The Observer as one of the ten most promising young players in Europe. Former Toulouse manager Alain Casanova called Thauvin  "a player in the image of Franck Ribéry … someone who is able to disrupt any opponent, someone very dangerous when he picks up speed. Very dangerous indeed." ESPN columnist Andy Brassell described him in 2013 as a wide player who is a "left-footer with fine acceleration and jaw-dropping close control."

Career statistics

Club

International

As of match played 11 June 2019
France score listed first, score column indicates score after each Thauvin goal

Honours
Bastia
Ligue 2: 2011–12

Marseille
UEFA Europa League runner-up: 2017–18

France U20
FIFA U-20 World Cup: 2013

France
FIFA World Cup: 2018

Individual
UNFP Ligue 1 Young Player of the Year: 2012–13
UNFP Ligue 1 Player of the Month: March 2017, November 2017, January 2018

Orders
Knight of the Legion of Honour: 2018

References

External links

 
 

1993 births
Living people
Footballers from Orléans
French footballers
France youth international footballers
France under-21 international footballers
France international footballers
Association football midfielders
Grenoble Foot 38 players
Lille OSC players
SC Bastia players
Olympique de Marseille players
Newcastle United F.C. players
Tigres UANL footballers
Udinese Calcio players
Ligue 1 players
Ligue 2 players
Premier League players
Liga MX players
2018 FIFA World Cup players
FIFA World Cup-winning players
French expatriate footballers
Expatriate footballers in England
Expatriate footballers in Mexico
Expatriate footballers in Italy
French expatriate sportspeople in England
French expatriate sportspeople in Mexico
French expatriate sportspeople in Italy
Chevaliers of the Légion d'honneur
Olympic footballers of France
Footballers at the 2020 Summer Olympics